Tyzack is a surname. Notable people with the surname include:

Florence Tyzack Parbury (1881–1960), English socialite
Margaret Tyzack (1931-2011), English actress
Michael Tyzack (1933-2007), English painter